Happy City: Transforming Our Lives Through Urban Design is a 2013 book written by the Canadian author Charles Montgomery.

Overview 
Gathering insights from the disciplines of psychology, neuroscience, urban planning and Montgomery’s own social experiments, the book makes the case that the manner in which we build our cities alters the way in which we feel, think, and behave as individuals and as a society. Montgomery argues that the happy city, the green city, and the low-carbon city are the same place, and we can all help build it.

Montgomery states that the book is about "seeing our city streets, hearts, and mobility systems as emotional infrastructure that can make or break the health or happiness of our citizens." From Stockton, California to Bogotá, Colombia, Montgomery discusses the urban challenges cities face and the innovative solutions being implemented all over the world to empower communities.

The book was a Finalist for the Shaughnessy Bishop-Cohen Prize for Political Writing and Charles Taylor Prize for Non-fiction, and a Winner of the Robert Bruss Real Estate Book Awards. It was also a shortlisted nominee for the 2014 Hilary Weston Writers' Trust Prize for Nonfiction.

The success of the book led Charles Montgomery to found the consulting firm, Happy Cities, which seeks to turn the lessons of the book into action by offering urban planning, design, and research consulting services to municipalities.

Content
The book contains 13 chapters and an epilogue:
The Mayor of Happy
The City has Always Been a Happiness Project
The (Broken) Social Scene
How We Got Here
Getting it Wrong
How to be Closer
Convivialities 
Mobilicities I: How Moving Feels, and Why It Does Not Feel Better
Mobilicities II: Freedom
Who Is The City For?
Everything Is Connected to Everything Else
Retrofitting Sprawl
Save Your City, Save Yourself

References

External links
Review of Happy City at the New York Times
Review of Happy City at The Guardian
Review of Happy City at Urban Land Institute
Review of Happy City at The Toronto Star
Review of Happy City at Vancouver Sun
Review of Happy City at Bloomberg Businessweek
Review of Happy City at Columbia Journalism Review
Review of Happy City at Livablecities.org
Review of Happy City at The Atlantic Cities

Books about urbanism
2013 non-fiction books
Canadian non-fiction books
Farrar, Straus and Giroux books